Bhangra may refer to:

 Bhangra (music), a genre of Punjabi music
 Bhangra (dance), a folk dance of Punjab region
 Bhangra (film), a 1959 Punjabi film

See also
 Bhangara, Nepal, a village development committee
 Banghra, Spanish music band